"Turn the World Around" is a song written by Ben Peters and was recorded as a 1967 single by Eddy Arnold.  The single was Eddy Arnold's ninety-seventh release on the country chart.  "Turn the World Around" would reach the number one spot on the country charts for one week and spend a total of fourteen weeks on the charts.

Chart performance

References

1967 singles
Eddy Arnold songs
Dean Martin songs
Songs written by Ben Peters
Song recordings produced by Chet Atkins
1967 songs
RCA Records singles